José David Mosquera Mosquera (born October 7, 1983 in Carepa, Antioquia) is a boxer from Colombia, who participated in the 2004 Summer Olympics for his native South American country. There he was outscored in the first round of the Lightweight (60 kg) division by America's Vicente Escobedo. He qualified for the Olympic Games by ending up in second place at the 2nd AIBA American 2004 Olympic Qualifying Tournament in Rio de Janeiro, Brazil.

Professional boxing record 

|-
| style="text-align:center;" colspan="8"|16 Wins (14 knockouts), 5 Losses, 1 Draw
|-  style="text-align:center; background:#e3e3e3;"
|  style="border-style:none none solid solid; "|Res.
|  style="border-style:none none solid solid; "|Record
|  style="border-style:none none solid solid; "|Opponent
|  style="border-style:none none solid solid; "|Type
|  style="border-style:none none solid solid; "|Round, Time
|  style="border-style:none none solid solid; "|Date
|  style="border-style:none none solid solid; "|Location
|  style="border-style:none none solid solid; "|Notes
|- align=center
|Loss||16-5-1||align=left| Abner Lopez
|
|
|
|align=left|
|align=left|
|- align=center
|Loss||16-4-1||align=left| Aaron Herrera
|
|
|
|align=left|
|align=left|
|- align=center
|Win||16-3-1||align=left| Cesar Rodriguez
|
|
|
|align=left|
|align=left|
|- align=center
|Win||15-3-1||align=left| Julio Cardozo
|
|
|
|align=left|
|align=left|
|- align=center
|Loss||14-3-1||align=left| Azael Cosio
|
|
|
|align=left|
|align=left|
|- align=center
|Loss||14-2-1||align=left| Armando Robles
|
|
|
|align=left|
|align=left|

External links

References
Profile

1983 births
Olympic boxers of Colombia
Living people
Boxers at the 2003 Pan American Games
Boxers at the 2004 Summer Olympics
Pan American Games competitors for Colombia
Colombian male boxers
Lightweight boxers
Sportspeople from Antioquia Department